Goldfinch  or The Goldfinch  may refer to:

Birds
 European goldfinch, Carduelis carduelis
 Some species of the genus Spinus:
 American goldfinch, Spinus tristis
 Lawrence's goldfinch, Spinus lawrencei
  Lesser goldfinch, Spinus psaltria

Arts, entertainment, and media
 The Goldfinch (painting) (1654), by Carel Fabritius
 The Goldfinch (novel) (2013) by Donna Tartt, in which Fabritius' painting features
 The Goldfinch (film) (2019), based on the novel
Distelfink, a goldfinch motif in Pennsylvania Dutch folk art

Science and technology
USS Goldfinch, US Navy ships
HMS Goldfinch, four ships of the Royal Navy and one of the shore establishment
Gloster Goldfinch, a British single-seat biplane fighter from the later 1920s

People
Goldfinch (surname)

Animal common name disambiguation pages